Joseph Gilbert Seamount is a large seamount in the Tasman Sea located  west of the South Island of New Zealand at the southern edge of the Lord Howe Rise.

The seamount is a continental fragment that rifted away from the South Tasman Rise and Challenger Plateau during the Cretaceous breakup of Gondwana.

References

Seamounts of the Tasman Sea
Geography of the New Zealand seabed
Continental fragments
Seamounts of New Zealand